There are 291 peaks in Norway with elevations of over  above sea level and that have a topographic prominence of more than 10 meters. The following list includes those 186 that have a topographic prominence of 50 meters or more. The topographic isolation refers to the shortest horizontal distance one would have to travel to find a higher summit.

Location of peaks
Most of these peaks are in the municipalities of Lom, Skjåk, Luster, and Vågå, connected to the mountain chain that reaches its prominence with Jotunheimen. There are also several peaks in Dovrefjell, Rondane, Dovre, Lesja, and Folldal that also reach above 2000 meters. All the peaks are to be found in 14 topographical maps (Norge 1:50000) published by the Norwegian government cartography office, of which 21 peaks are in 1518 II Galdhøpiggen, 18 in 1618 III Glittertinden, and 13 in 1617 IV Gjende. The northernmost is in the Dovre area, meaning there are no 2000 m peaks in northern Norway, even though there are some almost 2000 m there, and some above 2000 m in Sweden near the border.

Most of the difficult summits were ascended in the late 19th and early 20th century by a combination of Norwegian explorers, local guides (in particular the Sulheim family), and British adventurers.  Five women – Margaret S. Green, Theresa Bertheau, Antonette Kamstrup, Anne Aukrust, and Rønnaug Garmo – were the first to ascend some of these peaks. Aukrust and Garmo were from farms in Lom, where many of the peaks are located. The peak most recently climbed for the first time was Veobrehesten, first ascended in 1949.

Highest peaks in Norway with prominence above 50 m
The listing originates from www.nfo2000m.no.

Cross tabulation of number of peaks by height and primary factor

{| class="wikitable"
|+Cross tabulation of Norwegian peaks by height and primary factor (topographic prominence)
|-
!Height
!>2400 m
!>2300 m
!>2200 m
!>2100 m
!>2000 m
|-
|Prime factor
|
|
|
|
|
|-
|>500 m
|3
|5
|13
|22
|29
|-
|>250 m
|3
|11
|23
|42
|62
|-
|>100 m
|3
|19
|38
|73
|121
|-
|>50 m
|3
|21
|54
|105
|172
|-
|>30 m
|3
|22
|60
|125
|209
|-
|>10 m
|3
|28
|77
|170
|291
|}

See also
 List of highest points of Norwegian counties
 List of mountains in Norway by prominence

References

External links
 Norwegian mountaintops over 2000 m (In Norwegian)
 Statens Kartverk, Norway's governmental cartography office

Norway, peaks over 2000 meters

Norway
Mountains
Norway